The State Special Communications Service of Ukraine (SSSCIP), also known as Derzhspetszv'yazku, is a specialized executive authority of which the key functions include provision of secure government communications, government courier service, information protection and cyber defense.

The SSSCIP provides the country's leadership and core government institutions with reliable and secure communications, in both peacetime and wartime.

Functions and responsibilities 
The SSSCIP of Ukraine is responsible for 95 functions & 16 different systems in such spheres.
 information security & cybersecurity
 cryptography, digital signature, security of electronic trust services
 protection of state information and classified information, CII 
 government electronic communication
 state control 

The SSSCIP's role in the cybersecurity sphere:
1. Shaping and implementation of the National Cyber Defense Policy 

2. Shaping and implementation of the national policy on protection of governmental information resources in cyberspace 

3. Shaping and implementation of the national policy on cyber protection of critical information infrastructure 

4. Coordination of cyber defense-related activities by cybersecurity actors 

5. Introduction of operational and tactical cyber defense model 

6. Taking organizational and technical measures for preventing, identifying of and responding to cyber incidents and cyberattacks as well as elimination of their consequences 

7. Communicating cyber threats and appropriate methods of protection

Agencies, enterprises and facilities as part of the SSSCIP

Broadcasting, Radiocommunications & Television Concern 
The Broadcasting, Radiocommunications & Television Concern, also known as the BRTC, is a state-owned TV and radio relay and satellite broadcasting operator. The BRTC's infrastructure includes more than 500 antenna mast structures, more than 12 thousand km of radio relay lines, 2 powerful radio centers, a space communications station (SCS) and 2 earth transmitting stations. The Concern operates more than 400 radio and television transmitting stations.

Headquarters and units of the State Courier Service 
Provide top-level courier and communications services to the President of Ukraine, Chairman of the Verkhovna Rada, Prime Minister of Ukraine, public authorities, local self-government bodies, military administration bodies and other legal entities in accordance with the law.

Institute of Special Communications and Information Protection 
The SSSCIP's educational institution training specialists in cybersecurity and information security.

National Center for Operations and Technology Management of Telecommunications Networks 
In a time of war, coordinates the activities of mobile carriers and telecommunication providers and assumes administration of their networks.

Ukrainian Special Systems state-owned enterprise 
Ensures confidential communication, creation of comprehensive information protection systems and regulatory examination; provides electronic confidential services and information resources protection services.

State Enterprise of Special Communications 
Provides special communications for the most important national events — elections, nationwide referendums; delivers confidential correspondence and valuable items.

Diprozviazok Ukrainian Institute for Engineering and Development of Information and Communications Infrastructure, private joint stock company 
Develops the strategy of the unified national communications system and development of communications networks of Ukraine.

Ukrainian Scientific and Research Institute of Radio and Television state-owned enterprise 
Conducts research in the area of telecommunications and radiofrequency resource at the national and international levels. Ukrspetszviazok state-owned enterprise ensures operation of special-purpose telecommunication nodes.

SSSCIP's Volunteer Hub 
The place where efforts of volunteers are coordinated for the support of servicemen of the SSSCIP, Armed Forces of Ukraine and other forces of the security and defense sectors of Ukraine.

Contacts 
Website https://cip.gov.ua/ 
 Facebook: https://www.facebook.com/derzhspeczvyazku
 Telegram: https://t.me/dsszzi_official
 Instagram: https://www.instagram.com/dsszzi/ 
 YouTube: https://www.youtube.com/channel/UCIZRZt90fMKxEKeSgY4LB9Q 
 Twitter: https://twitter.com/dsszzi

Long Service Medal

See also
Telecommunications in Ukraine
Internet in Ukraine

References

External links

Ukrainian intelligence agencies
Signals intelligence agencies
Presidency of Ukraine